Bonggo, also known as Armopa, is an Austronesian language spoken in Bonggo District, Sarmi Regency on the north coast of Papua province, Indonesia.

See also
Sarmi languages for a comparison with related languages

References

Languages of western New Guinea
Sarmi–Jayapura languages